Horatio Chapin Burchard (September 22, 1825 – May 14, 1908) was a U.S. Representative from Illinois, 15th Director of the United States Mint, member of the International Statistical Institute, and father of the Consumer Price Index (CPI).

Born in Marshall, New York, Burchard attended the public schools and private preparatory schools. He was graduated from Hamilton College, Clinton, New York, in 1850. He was a member of the Chi Psi fraternity at Hamilton. He studied law. He was admitted to the bar in 1854 and commenced practice in Freeport, Illinois. He served as member of the Illinois House of Representatives 1863-1866.

Burchard was elected as a Republican to the Forty-first Congress to fill the vacancy caused by the resignation of Elihu B. Washburne. He was reelected to the Forty-second and to the three succeeding Congresses and served from December 6, 1869 to March 3, 1879. During his time in the U.S. House of Representatives, he was appointed a member of the powerful Ways and Means Committee where he was made Chairman of the Subcommittee on Internal Revenue. Under his Chairmanship of the Subcommittee on Internal Revenue, the first legislation proposing a peacetime income tax was sponsored and debated. However, no income tax legislation was successful passed during his Chairmanship. He was an unsuccessful candidate for renomination in 1878. He served as director of the United States Mint 1879-1885. During his tenure as the Director of the U.S. Mint, he created the Consumer Price Index (CPI), a measurement tool that has become ubiquitous in business and economics. He resumed the practice of law in Freeport. He served as member of the commission to revise the State revenue laws in 1885 and 1886. He was placed in charge of the jury of awards of the mining department of the World's Columbian Exposition at Chicago in 1893. He died in Freeport, and was interred in Oakland Cemetery.

References

1825 births
1908 deaths
Republican Party members of the Illinois House of Representatives
People from Freeport, Illinois
Directors of the United States Mint
Republican Party members of the United States House of Representatives from Illinois
19th-century American politicians
Hayes administration personnel
Garfield administration personnel
Arthur administration personnel
Cleveland administration personnel